Soleiman Pakseresht (born 23 August 1972 in Piranshahr) is an Iranian sociologist and associate professor at Bu-Ali Sina University whose work focuses on social impact assessment, political sociology and sociology of cyberspace. He is representative of Iran at the International Labour Organization (ILO)]].

Books
 Social Capital in Iran: Status, Challenges and Strategies. Center for Strategic Research, Tehran.
 Social Impact Analysis in Practice, Office for Social and Cultural Studies of Tehran, Social and Cultural Deputy, Tehran Municipality, Tehran.
 Internet Consumption in Leisure Styles of Youth, Research center for culture, Art and Communication publish office, Tehran.

References

External links
Pakseresht at Academia

Living people
Iranian sociologists
Tarbiat Modares University alumni
Allameh Tabataba'i University alumni
University of Tehran alumni
Academic staff of Bu-Ali Sina University
1972 births
Iranian Sunni Muslims
Mass media theorists
Political sociologists
20th-century Iranian people
21st-century Iranian people
People from West Azerbaijan Province